Vladimir Trofimovich Kornilov (5 November 1923 – 12 April 1983) was a Soviet footballer who played as a goalkeeper in the 1950s.

Career
Born in Samara, Samara Oblast, Vladimir Kornilov began playing youth football with Zenit Kuybyshev. In 1949, Kornilov joined Krylia Sovetov where he made his professional debut in the Soviet First League. He appeared in 120 competitive matches for Krylia Sovetov, was named to the list of the 33 best Soviet Top League players in 1952.

Honors

Club
 Soviet Cup runner-up: 1953
 Soviet First League winner: 1956

Individual
 Top 33 players year-end list: 1952

References

External links
 Vladimir Kornilov (Krylia Sovetov) at Footballfacts.ru

1923 births
1983 deaths
Soviet footballers
PFC Krylia Sovetov Samara players
Association football goalkeepers